Saša Ilić (Serbian Cyrillic: Саша Илић,  or ; born 18 July 1972) is a retired Serbian-Australian football goalkeeper.

Club career
Born in Melbourne, Ilić started playing soccer with Sydney-based Bonnyrigg White Eagles. He later moved to his parents' home country and started playing for Grafičar Beograd in the Belgrade Zone League, before signing with Radnički Beograd of the First League of FR Yugoslavia.

Ilić later joined Charlton Athletic, where he became most well-known. He was a regular in goal in the latter half of the 1997–98 season and kept a record 9 clean sheets in a row, including both play-off semi-finals against Ipswich Town. The run was ended as Charlton gained promotion after a classic 4–4 play-off final, in which he saved the deciding penalty from Michael Gray in a 7–6 win over Sunderland on penalties in the First Division play-off final. After Charlton's relegation in 1998–99, Ilić lost his place in the team to new signing Dean Kiely.

In February 2000 he went on loan to West Ham United but made just one appearance - a 4–0 defeat at home to Everton in the Premier League. In September 2001 he went on loan to Portsmouth and made seven appearances.

Ilić left Charlton in 2002 and joined Hungarian side ZTE where he played against Manchester United in a UEFA Champions League qualifier. ZTE won the first leg 1–0 but lost the second leg 5–0, a game in which Ilić was also sent off for a foul on Ruud van Nistelrooy.

In February 2003 he returned to Portsmouth to provide back up to Shaka Hislop and Yoshikatsu Kawaguchi. However he made no appearances as Portsmouth won promotion to the Premier League, and then joined Barnsley in August 2003.

International career
Ilić made two appearances for the Serbia and Montenegro national football team. His debut was in December 1998 in a friendly match against Israel as a second-half substitute and his second and last appearance was in a home loss against Russia during the 2002 FIFA World Cup qualification.

References

External links
 
 
 

1972 births
Living people
Soccer players from Melbourne
Australian people of Serbian descent
Association football goalkeepers
Serbian footballers
Serbia and Montenegro international footballers
RFK Grafičar Beograd players
FK Radnički Beograd players
St. Leonards F.C. players
Charlton Athletic F.C. players
West Ham United F.C. players
Portsmouth F.C. players
Barnsley F.C. players
Leeds United F.C. players
Blackpool F.C. players
Aberdeen F.C. players
Bonnyrigg White Eagles FC players
Premier League players
Expatriate footballers in England
Expatriate footballers in Scotland
Australian expatriate sportspeople in Scotland
Australian expatriate sportspeople in England
Serbia and Montenegro footballers
Serbia and Montenegro expatriate sportspeople in England
Serbia and Montenegro expatriate sportspeople in Scotland
Australian expatriate sportspeople in Hungary
Serbia and Montenegro expatriate sportspeople in Hungary
Expatriate footballers in Hungary
Zalaegerszegi TE players
English Football League players